George Washington (February 22, 1732, 1799) was an American military officer, statesman, and Founding Father who served as the first president of the United States from 1789 to 1797. Appointed by the Continental Congress as commander of the Continental Army, Washington led Patriot forces to victory in the American Revolutionary War and served as president of the Constitutional Convention of 1787, which created and ratified the Constitution of the United States and the American federal government. Washington has been called the "Father of his Country" for his manifold leadership in the nation's founding.

Washington's first public office, from 1749 to 1750, was as surveyor of Culpeper County, Virginia. He subsequently received his first military training and was assigned command of the Virginia Regiment during the French and Indian War. He was later elected to the Virginia House of Burgesses and was named a delegate to the Continental Congress, where he was appointed Commanding General of the Continental Army and led American forces allied with France to victory over the British at the siege of Yorktown in 1781 during the Revolutionary War, paving the way for American independence. He resigned his commission in 1783 after the Treaty of Paris was signed.

Washington played an indispensable role in adopting and ratifying the Constitution of the United States, which replaced the Articles of Confederation in 1789 and remains the world's longest-standing written and codified national constitution to this day. He was then twice elected president by the Electoral College unanimously. As the first U.S. president, Washington implemented a strong, well-financed national government while remaining impartial in a fierce rivalry that emerged between cabinet members Thomas Jefferson and Alexander Hamilton. During the French Revolution, he proclaimed a policy of neutrality while sanctioning the Jay Treaty. He set enduring precedents for the office of president, including use of the title "Mr. President" and taking an Oath of Office with his hand on a Bible. His Farewell Address on September 19, 1796, is widely regarded as a preeminent statement on republicanism.

Washington was a slave owner who had a complicated relationship with slavery. During his lifetime, he owned a cumulative total of over 577 slaves, who were forced to work on his farms and wherever he lived, including the President's House in Philadelphia. Yet, as president, he also signed laws passed by Congress that both protected and curtailed slavery. His will stated that one of his slaves, William Lee, should be freed upon his death and that the other 123 slaves should be freed on his wife's death, though she freed them earlier during her lifetime.

Washington endeavored to assimilate Native Americans into the Anglo-American culture. He also waged military campaigns against Native American nations during the Revolutionary War and the Northwest Indian War. He was a member of the Anglican Church and the Freemasons and supported broad religious freedom as the Continental Army commanding general and nation's first president. Upon his death, Washington was eulogized by Henry "Light-Horse Harry" Lee as "first in war, first in peace, and first in the hearts of his countrymen".

Washington has been memorialized by monuments, a federal holiday, various media depictions, geographical locations including the national capital, the State of Washington, stamps, and currency. Many scholars and ordinary Americans alike rank him among the greatest U.S. presidents. In 1976, Washington was posthumously promoted to the rank of General of the Armies, the highest rank in the U.S. Army.

Early life (1732–1752) 

The Washington family was a wealthy Virginia planter family that had made its fortune through land speculation and the cultivation of tobacco. Washington's great-grandfather John Washington emigrated in 1656 from Sulgrave, Northamptonshire, England, to the English colony of Virginia where he accumulated  of land, including Little Hunting Creek on the Potomac River. George Washington was born on February 22, 1732, at Popes Creek in Westmoreland County, in the British colony of Virginia, and was the first of six children of Augustine and Mary Ball Washington. His father was a justice of the peace and a prominent public figure who had four additional children from his first marriage to Jane Butler. The family moved to Little Hunting Creek in 1735. In 1738, they moved to Ferry Farm near Fredericksburg, Virginia, on the Rappahannock River. When Augustine died in 1743, Washington inherited Ferry Farm and ten slaves; his older half-brother Lawrence inherited Little Hunting Creek and renamed it Mount Vernon.

Washington did not have the formal education his elder brothers received at Appleby Grammar School in England, but he did attend the Lower Church School in Hartfield. He learned mathematics, trigonometry, and land surveying and became a talented draftsman and map-maker. By early adulthood, he was writing with "considerable force" and "precision". In his pursuit of admiration, status, and power, his writing displayed little wit or humor.

Washington often visited Mount Vernon and Belvoir, the plantation that belonged to Lawrence's father-in-law William Fairfax. Fairfax became Washington's patron and surrogate father, and Washington spent a month in 1748 with a team surveying Fairfax's Shenandoah Valley property. The following year he received a surveyor's license from the College of William & Mary when he was 17 years old. Even though Washington had not served the customary apprenticeship, Fairfax appointed him surveyor of Culpeper County, Virginia, and he appeared in Culpeper County to take his oath of office July 20, 1749. He subsequently familiarized himself with the frontier region, and though he resigned from the job in 1750, he continued to do surveys west of the Blue Ridge Mountains. By 1752 he had bought almost  in the Valley and owned .

In 1751, Washington made his only trip abroad when he accompanied Lawrence to Barbados, hoping the climate would cure his brother's tuberculosis. Washington contracted smallpox during that trip, which immunized him and left his face slightly scarred. Lawrence died in 1752, and Washington leased Mount Vernon from his widow Anne; he inherited it outright after her death in 1761.

Colonial military career (1752–1758) 
Lawrence Washington's service as adjutant general of the Virginia militia inspired his half-brother George to seek a commission. Virginia's lieutenant governor, Robert Dinwiddie, appointed George Washington as a major and commander of one of the four militia districts. The British and French were competing for control of the Ohio Valley. While the British were constructing forts along the Ohio River, the French were doing the same—constructing forts between the Ohio River and Lake Erie.

In October 1753, Dinwiddie appointed Washington as a special envoy. He had sent George to demand French forces to vacate land that was being claimed by the British. Washington was also appointed to make peace with the Iroquois Confederacy, and to gather further intelligence about the French forces. Washington met with Half-King Tanacharison, and other Iroquois chiefs, at Logstown, and gathered information about the numbers and locations of the French forts, as well as intelligence concerning individuals taken prisoner by the French. Washington was given the nickname Conotocaurius (town destroyer or devourer of villages) by Tanacharison. The nickname had previously been given to his great-grandfather John Washington in the late seventeenth century by the Susquehannock.

Washington's party reached the Ohio River in November 1753, and was intercepted by a French patrol. The party was escorted to Fort Le Boeuf, where Washington was received in a friendly manner. He delivered the British demand to vacate to the French commander Saint-Pierre, but the French refused to leave. Saint-Pierre gave Washington his official answer in a sealed envelope after a few days' delay, as well as food and extra winter clothing for his party's journey back to Virginia. Washington completed the precarious mission in 77 days, in difficult winter conditions, achieving a measure of distinction when his report was published in Virginia and in London.

French and Indian War

In February 1754, Dinwiddie promoted Washington to lieutenant colonel and second-in-command of the 300-strong Virginia Regiment, with orders to confront French forces at the Forks of the Ohio. Washington set out for the Forks with half the regiment in April and soon learned a French force of 1,000 had begun construction of Fort Duquesne there.

The French detachment proved to be only about 50 men, so Washington advanced on May 28 with a small force of Virginians and Indian allies to ambush them. What took place, known as the Battle of Jumonville Glen or the "Jumonville affair", was disputed, and French forces were killed outright with muskets and hatchets. French commander Joseph Coulon de Jumonville, who carried a diplomatic message for the British to evacuate, was killed. French forces found Jumonville and some of his men dead and scalped and assumed Washington was responsible. Washington blamed his translator for not communicating the French intentions. Dinwiddie congratulated Washington for his victory over the French. This incident ignited the French and Indian War, which later became part of the larger Seven Years' War.

The full Virginia Regiment joined Washington at Fort Necessity the following month with news that he had been promoted to command of the regiment and colonel upon the regimental commander's death. The regiment was reinforced by an independent company of a hundred South Carolinians led by Captain James Mackay, whose royal commission outranked that of Washington, and a conflict of command ensued. On July 3, a French force attacked with 900 men, and the ensuing battle ended in Washington's surrender. In the aftermath, Colonel James Innes took command of intercolonial forces, the Virginia Regiment was divided, and Washington was offered a captaincy which he refused, with the resignation of his commission.

In 1755, Washington served voluntarily as an aide to General Edward Braddock, who led a British expedition to expel the French from Fort Duquesne and the Ohio Country. On Washington's recommendation, Braddock split the army into one main column and a lightly equipped "flying column". Suffering from a severe case of dysentery, Washington was left behind, and when he rejoined Braddock at Monongahela the French and their Indian allies ambushed the divided army. Two-thirds of the British force became casualties, including the mortally wounded Braddock. Under the command of Lieutenant Colonel Thomas Gage, Washington, still very ill, rallied the survivors and formed a rear guard, allowing the remnants of the force to disengage and retreat. During the engagement, he had two horses shot from under him, and his hat and coat were bullet-pierced. His conduct under fire redeemed his reputation among critics of his command in the Battle of Fort Necessity, but he was not included by the succeeding commander (Colonel Thomas Dunbar) in planning subsequent operations.

The Virginia Regiment was reconstituted in August 1755, and Dinwiddie appointed Washington its commander, again with the rank of colonel. Washington clashed over seniority almost immediately, this time with John Dagworthy, another captain of superior royal rank, who commanded a detachment of Marylanders at the regiment's headquarters in Fort Cumberland. Washington, impatient for an offensive against Fort Duquesne, was convinced Braddock would have granted him a royal commission and pressed his case in February 1756 with Braddock's successor as Commander-in-Chief, William Shirley, and again in January 1757 with Shirley's successor, Lord Loudoun. Shirley ruled in Washington's favor only in the matter of Dagworthy; Loudoun humiliated Washington, refused him a royal commission and agreed only to relieve him of the responsibility of manning Fort Cumberland.

In 1758, the Virginia Regiment was assigned to the British Forbes Expedition to capture Fort Duquesne. Washington disagreed with General John Forbes' tactics and chosen route. Forbes nevertheless made Washington a brevet brigadier general and gave him command of one of the three brigades that would assault the fort. The French abandoned the fort and the valley before the assault was launched; Washington saw only a friendly fire incident which left 14 dead and 26 injured. The war lasted another four years, and Washington resigned his commission and returned to Mount Vernon.

Under Washington, the Virginia Regiment had defended  of frontier against twenty Indian attacks in ten months. He increased the professionalism of the regiment as it increased from 300 to 1,000 men, and Virginia's frontier population suffered less than other colonies. Some historians have said this was Washington's "only unqualified success" during the war. Though he failed to realize a royal commission, he did gain self-confidence, leadership skills, and invaluable knowledge of British military tactics. The destructive competition Washington witnessed among colonial politicians fostered his later support of a strong central government.

Marriage, civilian, and political life (1755–1775) 

On January 6, 1759, Washington, at age 26, married Martha Dandridge Custis, the 27-year-old widow of wealthy plantation owner Daniel Parke Custis. The marriage took place at Martha's estate; she was intelligent, gracious, and experienced in managing a planter's estate, and the couple created a happy marriage. They raised John Parke Custis (Jacky) and Martha Parke Custis (Patsy), children from her previous marriage, and later Jacky's children Eleanor Parke Custis (Nelly) and George Washington Parke Custis (Washy). Washington's 1751 bout with smallpox is thought to have rendered him sterile, though it is equally likely that "Martha may have sustained injury during the birth of Patsy, her final child, making additional births impossible." The couple lamented not having any children together. They moved to Mount Vernon, near Alexandria, where he took up life as a planter of tobacco and wheat and emerged as a political figure.

The marriage gave Washington control over Martha's one-third dower interest in the  Custis estate, and he managed the remaining two-thirds for Martha's children; the estate also included 84 slaves. He became one of Virginia's wealthiest men, which increased his social standing.

At Washington's urging, Governor Lord Botetourt fulfilled Dinwiddie's 1754 promise of land bounties to all-volunteer militia during the French and Indian War. In late 1770, Washington inspected the lands in the Ohio and Great Kanawha regions, and he engaged surveyor William Crawford to subdivide it. Crawford allotted  to Washington; Washington told the veterans that their land was hilly and unsuitable for farming, and he agreed to purchase , leaving some feeling they had been duped.

Washington's political activities included supporting the candidacy of his friend George William Fairfax in his 1755 bid to represent the region in the Virginia House of Burgesses. This support led to a dispute which resulted in a physical altercation between Washington and another Virginia planter, William Payne. Washington defused the situation, including ordering officers from the Virginia Regiment to stand down. Washington apologized to Payne the following day at a tavern. Payne had been expecting to be challenged to a duel.

As a respected military hero and large landowner, Washington held local offices and was elected to the Virginia provincial legislature, representing Frederick County in the House of Burgesses for seven years beginning in 1758. He plied the voters with beer, brandy, and other beverages, although he was absent while serving on the Forbes Expedition. He won the election with roughly 40 percent of the vote, defeating three other candidates with the help of several local supporters. He rarely spoke in his early legislative career, but he became a prominent critic of Britain's taxation policy and mercantilist policies towards the American colonies starting in the 1760s.

By occupation, Washington was a planter, and he imported luxuries and other goods from England, paying for them by exporting tobacco. His profligate spending combined with low tobacco prices left him £1,800 in debt by 1764, prompting him to diversify his holdings. In 1765, because of erosion and other soil problems, he changed Mount Vernon's primary cash crop from tobacco to wheat and expanded operations to include corn flour milling and fishing. Washington also took time for leisure with fox hunting, fishing, dances, theater, cards, backgammon, and billiards.

Washington soon was counted among the political and social elite in Virginia. From 1768 to 1775, he invited some 2,000 guests to his Mount Vernon estate, mostly those whom he considered people of rank, and was known to be exceptionally cordial toward his guests. He became more politically active in 1769, presenting legislation in the Virginia Assembly to establish an embargo on goods from Great Britain.

Washington's step-daughter Patsy Custis suffered from epileptic attacks from age 12, and she died in his arms in 1773. The following day, he wrote to Burwell Bassett: "It is easier to conceive, than to describe, the distress of this Family". He canceled all business activity and remained with Martha every night for three months.

Opposition to the British Parliament and Crown 

Washington played a central role before and during the American Revolution. His distrust of the British military had begun when he was passed over for promotion into the Regular Army. Opposed to taxes imposed by the British Parliament on the Colonies without proper representation, he and other colonists were also angered by the Royal Proclamation of 1763 which banned American settlement west of the Allegheny Mountains and protected the British fur trade.

Washington believed the Stamp Act of 1765 was an "Act of Oppression", and he celebrated its repeal the following year. In March 1766, Parliament passed the Declaratory Act asserting that Parliamentary law superseded colonial law. In the late 1760s, the interference of the British Crown in American lucrative western land speculation spurred on the American Revolution. Washington himself was a prosperous land speculator, and in 1767, he encouraged "adventures" to acquire backcountry western lands. Washington helped lead widespread protests against the Townshend Acts passed by Parliament in 1767, and he introduced a proposal in May 1769 drafted by George Mason which called Virginians to boycott British goods; the Acts were mostly repealed in 1770.

Parliament sought to punish Massachusetts colonists for their role in the Boston Tea Party in 1774 by passing the Coercive Acts, which Washington referred to as "an invasion of our rights and privileges". He said Americans must not submit to acts of tyranny since "custom and use shall make us as tame and abject slaves, as the blacks we rule over with such arbitrary sway". That July, he and George Mason drafted a list of resolutions for the Fairfax County committee which Washington chaired, and the committee adopted the Fairfax Resolves calling for a Continental Congress, and an end to the slave trade. On August 1, Washington attended the First Virginia Convention, where he was selected as a delegate to the First Continental Congress, September 5 to October 26, 1774, which he also attended. As tensions rose in 1774, he helped train county militias in Virginia and organized enforcement of the Continental Association boycott of British goods instituted by the Congress.

The American Revolutionary War began on April 19, 1775, with the Battles of Lexington and Concord and the Siege of Boston. The colonists were divided over breaking away from British rule and split into two factions: Patriots who rejected British rule, and Loyalists who desired to remain subject to the King. General Thomas Gage was commander of British forces in America at the beginning of the war. Upon hearing the shocking news of the onset of war, Washington was "sobered and dismayed", and he hastily departed Mount Vernon on May 4, 1775, to join the Second Continental Congress in Philadelphia.

Commander in chief (1775–1783) 

Congress created the Continental Army on June 14, 1775, and Samuel and John Adams nominated Washington to become its commander-in-chief. Washington was chosen over John Hancock because of his military experience and the belief that a Virginian would better unite the colonies. He was considered an incisive leader who kept his ambition in check. He was unanimously elected commander in chief by Congress the next day.

Washington appeared before Congress in uniform and gave an acceptance speech on June 16, declining a salary—though he was later reimbursed expenses. He was commissioned on June 19 and was roundly praised by Congressional delegates, including John Adams, who proclaimed that he was the man best suited to lead and unite the colonies. Congress appointed Washington "General & Commander in chief of the army of the United Colonies and of all the forces raised or to be raised by them", and instructed him to take charge of the siege of Boston on June 22, 1775.

Congress chose his primary staff officers, including Major General Artemas Ward, Adjutant General Horatio Gates, Major General Charles Lee, Major General Philip Schuyler, Major General Nathanael Greene, Colonel Henry Knox, and Colonel Alexander Hamilton. Washington was impressed by Colonel Benedict Arnold and gave him responsibility for launching an invasion of Canada. He also engaged French and Indian War compatriot Brigadier General Daniel Morgan. Henry Knox impressed Adams with ordnance knowledge, and Washington promoted him to colonel and chief of artillery.

At the start of the war, Washington opposed the recruiting of blacks, both free and enslaved, into the Continental Army. After his appointment, Washington banned their enlistment. The British saw an opportunity to divide the colonies, and the colonial governor of Virginia issued a proclamation, which promised freedom to slaves if they joined the British. Desperate for manpower by late 1777, Washington relented and overturned his ban. By the end of the war, around one-tenth of Washington's army were blacks. Following the British surrender, Washington sought to enforce terms of the preliminary Treaty of Paris (1783) by reclaiming slaves freed by the British and returning them to servitude. He arranged to make this request to Sir Guy Carleton on May 6, 1783. Instead, Carleton issued 3,000 freedom certificates and all former slaves in New York City were able to leave before the city was evacuated by the British in late November 1783.

Siege of Boston 

Early in 1775, in response to the growing rebellious movement, London sent British troops, commanded by General Thomas Gage, to occupy Boston. They set up fortifications about the city, making it impervious to attack. Various local militias surrounded the city and effectively trapped the British, resulting in a standoff.

As Washington headed for Boston, word of his march preceded him, and he was greeted everywhere; gradually, he became a symbol of the Patriot cause. Upon arrival on July 2, 1775, two weeks after the Patriot defeat at nearby Bunker Hill, he set up his Cambridge, Massachusetts headquarters and inspected the new army there, only to find an undisciplined and badly outfitted militia. After consultation, he initiated Benjamin Franklin's suggested reforms—drilling the soldiers and imposing strict discipline, floggings, and incarceration. Washington ordered his officers to identify the skills of recruits to ensure military effectiveness, while removing incompetent officers. He petitioned Gage, his former superior, to release captured Patriot officers from prison and treat them humanely. In October 1775, King George III declared that the colonies were in open rebellion and relieved General Gage of command for incompetence, replacing him with General William Howe.

The Continental Army, further diminished by expiring short-term enlistments, and by January 1776 reduced by half to 9,600 men, had to be supplemented with the militia, and was joined by Knox with heavy artillery captured from Fort Ticonderoga. When the Charles River froze over, Washington was eager to cross and storm Boston, but General Gates and others were opposed to untrained militia striking well-garrisoned fortifications. Washington reluctantly agreed to secure the Dorchester Heights, 100 feet above Boston, in an attempt to force the British out of the city. On March 9, under cover of darkness, Washington's troops brought up Knox's big guns and bombarded British ships in Boston harbor. On March 17, 9,000 British troops and Loyalists began a chaotic ten-day evacuation of Boston aboard 120 ships. Soon after, Washington entered the city with 500 men, with explicit orders not to plunder the city. He ordered variolation against smallpox to great effect, as he did later in Morristown, New Jersey. He refrained from exerting military authority in Boston, leaving civilian matters in the hands of local authorities.

Invasion of Quebec (1775)

The Invasion of Quebec (June 1775 – October 1776, French: Invasion du Québec) was the first major military initiative by the newly formed Continental Army during the American Revolutionary War. On June 27, 1775, Congress authorized General Philip Schuyler to investigate, and, if it seemed appropriate, begin an invasion. Benedict Arnold, passed over for its command, went to Boston and convinced General George Washington to send a supporting force to Quebec City under his command. The objective of the campaign was to seize the Province of Quebec (part of modern-day Canada) from Great Britain, and persuade French-speaking Canadiens to join the revolution on the side of the Thirteen Colonies. One expedition left Fort Ticonderoga under Richard Montgomery, besieged and captured Fort St. Johns, and very nearly captured British General Guy Carleton when taking Montreal. The other expedition, under Benedict Arnold, left Cambridge, Massachusetts and traveled with great difficulty through the wilderness of Maine to Quebec City. The two forces joined there, but they were defeated at the Battle of Quebec in December 1775, where Montgomery died.

Battle of Long Island

Washington then proceeded to New York City, arriving on April 13, 1776, and began constructing fortifications to thwart the expected British attack. He ordered his occupying forces to treat civilians and their property with respect, to avoid the abuses which Bostonian citizens suffered at the hands of British troops during their occupation. A plot to assassinate or capture him was discovered and thwarted, resulting in the arrest of 98 people involved or complicit (56 of which were from Long Island (Kings (Brooklyn) and Queens counties)), including the Loyalist Mayor of New York David Mathews. Washington's bodyguard, Thomas Hickey, was hanged for mutiny and sedition. General Howe transported his resupplied army, with the British fleet, from Halifax to New York, knowing the city was key to securing the continent. George Germain, who ran the British war effort in England, believed it could be won with one "decisive blow". The British forces, including more than a hundred ships and thousands of troops, began arriving on Staten Island on July2 to lay siege to the city. After the Declaration of Independence was adopted on July 4, Washington informed his troops in his general orders of July9 that Congress had declared the united colonies to be "free and independent states".

Howe's troop strength totaled 32,000 regulars and Hessian auxiliaries, and Washington's consisted of 23,000, mostly raw recruits and militia. In August, Howe landed 20,000 troops at Gravesend, Brooklyn, and approached Washington's fortifications, as George III proclaimed the rebellious American colonists to be traitors. Washington, opposing his generals, chose to fight, based upon inaccurate information that Howe's army had only 8,000-plus troops. In the Battle of Long Island, Howe assaulted Washington's flank and inflicted 1,500 Patriot casualties, the British suffering 400. Washington retreated, instructing General William Heath to acquisition river craft in the area. On August 30, General William Alexander held off the British and gave cover while the army crossed the East River under darkness to Manhattan Island without loss of life or materiel, although Alexander was captured. Colonel John Glover's Massachusetts regiment successfully evacuated Washington's 9,000 men, horses, and artillery from Brooklyn to Manhattan on August 29.

Howe was emboldened by his Long Island victory and dispatched Washington as "George Washington, Esq." in futility to negotiate peace. Washington declined, demanding to be addressed with diplomatic protocol, as general and fellow belligerent, not as a "rebel", lest his men are hanged as such if captured. The Royal Navy bombarded the unstable earthworks on lower Manhattan Island. Washington, with misgivings, heeded the advice of Generals Greene and Putnam to defend Fort Washington. They were unable to hold it, and Washington abandoned it despite General Lee's objections, as his army retired north to the White Plains. Howe's pursuit forced Washington to retreat across the Hudson River to Fort Lee to avoid encirclement. Howe landed his troops on Manhattan in November and captured Fort Washington, inflicting high casualties on the Americans. Washington was responsible for delaying the retreat, though he blamed Congress and General Greene. Loyalists in New York considered Howe a liberator and spread a rumor that Washington had set fire to the city. Patriot morale reached its lowest when Lee was captured. Now reduced to 5,400 troops, Washington's army retreated through New Jersey, and Howe broke off pursuit, delaying his advance on Philadelphia, and set up winter quarters in New York.

Crossing the Delaware, Trenton, and Princeton 

Washington crossed the Delaware River into Pennsylvania, where Lee's replacement John Sullivan joined him with 2,000 more troops. The future of the Continental Army was in doubt for lack of supplies, a harsh winter, expiring enlistments, and desertions. Washington was disappointed that many New Jersey residents were Loyalists or skeptical about the prospect of independence.

Howe split up his British Army and posted a Hessian garrison at Trenton to hold western New Jersey and the east shore of the Delaware, but the army appeared complacent, and Washington and his generals devised a surprise attack on the Hessians at Trenton, which he codenamed "Victory or Death". The army was to cross the Delaware River to Trenton in three divisions: one led by Washington (2,400 troops), another by General James Ewing (700), and the third by Colonel John Cadwalader (1,500). The force was to then split, with Washington taking the Pennington Road and General Sullivan traveling south on the river's edge.

Washington first ordered a 60-mile search for Durham boats to transport his army, and he ordered the destruction of vessels that could be used by the British. Washington crossed the Delaware River on Christmas night, December 25, 1776, while he personally risked capture staking out the Jersey shoreline. His men followed across the ice-obstructed river in sleet and snow from McConkey's Ferry, with 40 men per vessel. The wind churned up the waters, and they were pelted with hail, but by 3:00a.m. on December 26, they made it across with no losses. Henry Knox was delayed, managing frightened horses and about 18 field guns on flat-bottomed ferries. Cadwalader and Ewing failed to cross due to the ice and heavy currents, and awaiting Washington doubted his planned attack on Trenton. Once Knox arrived, Washington proceeded to Trenton to take only his troops against the Hessians, rather than risk being spotted returning his army to Pennsylvania.

The troops spotted Hessian positions a mile from Trenton, so Washington split his force into two columns, rallying his men: "Soldiers keep by your officers. For God's sake, keep by your officers." The two columns were separated at the Birmingham crossroads. General Nathanael Greene's column took the upper Ferry Road, led by Washington, and General John Sullivan's column advanced on River Road. (See map.) The Americans marched in sleet and snowfall. Many were shoeless with bloodied feet, and two died of exposure. Meanwhile, Hessian Commander Johann Rall was held up at the home of Abraham Hunt, of Trenton, who had placated Rall and some of his officers with plenty of food and drink into the late hours of the evening and morning. At sunrise, Washington, aided by Major General Knox and artillery, led his men in a surprise attack on an unsuspecting Rall. The Hessians had 22 killed, including Colonel Rall, 83 wounded, and 850 captured with supplies.

Washington retreated across the Delaware River to Pennsylvania and returned to New Jersey on January 3, 1777, launching an attack on British regulars at Princeton, with 40 Americans killed or wounded and 273 British killed or captured. American Generals Hugh Mercer and John Cadwalader were being driven back by the British when Mercer was mortally wounded, then Washington arrived and led the men in a counterattack which advanced to within  of the British line.

Some British troops retreated after a brief stand, while others took refuge in Nassau Hall, which became the target of Colonel Alexander Hamilton's cannons. Washington's troops charged, the British surrendered in less than an hour, and 194 soldiers laid down their arms. Howe retreated to New York City where his army remained inactive until early the next year. From January to May, Washington took up winter headquarters in Jacob Arnold's Tavern in Morristown, New Jersey, while he received munition from Hibernia mines. Meanwhile, "his troops stayed in [locals]’ homes" or camped in the Loantaka Valley to the east. While in Morristown, Washington disrupted British supply lines and expelled them from parts of New Jersey. Washington later said the British could have successfully counterattacked his encampment before his troops were dug in. The victories at Trenton and Princeton by Washington revived Patriot morale and changed the course of the war.

The British still controlled New York, and many Patriot soldiers did not re-enlist or deserted after the harsh winter campaign. Congress instituted greater rewards for re-enlisting and punishments for desertion to effect greater troop numbers. Strategically, Washington's victories were pivotal for the Revolution and quashed the British strategy of showing overwhelming force followed by offering generous terms. In February 1777, word reached London of the American victories at Trenton and Princeton, and the British realized the Patriots were in a position to demand unconditional independence.

Brandywine, Germantown, and Saratoga 

In July 1777, British General John Burgoyne led the Saratoga campaign south from Quebec through Lake Champlain and recaptured Fort Ticonderoga intending to divide New England, including control of the Hudson River. However, General Howe in British-occupied New York blundered, taking his army south to Philadelphia rather than up the Hudson River to join Burgoyne near Albany. Meanwhile, Washington and Gilbert du Motier, Marquis de Lafayette rushed to Philadelphia to engage Howe and were shocked to learn of Burgoyne's progress in upstate New York, where the Patriots were led by General Philip Schuyler and successor Horatio Gates. Washington's army of less experienced men were defeated in the pitched battles at Philadelphia.

Howe outmaneuvered Washington at the Battle of Brandywine on September 11, 1777, and marched unopposed into the nation's capital at Philadelphia. A Patriot attack failed against the British at Germantown in October. Major General Thomas Conway prompted some members of Congress (referred to as the Conway Cabal) to consider removing Washington from command because of the losses incurred at Philadelphia. Washington's supporters resisted, and the matter was finally dropped after much deliberation. Once the plot was exposed, Conway wrote an apology to Washington, resigned, and returned to France.

Washington was concerned with Howe's movements during the Saratoga campaign to the north, and he was also aware that Burgoyne was moving south toward Saratoga from Quebec. Washington took some risks to support Gates' army, sending reinforcements north with Generals Benedict Arnold, his most aggressive field commander, and Benjamin Lincoln. On October 7, 1777, Burgoyne tried to take Bemis Heights but was isolated from support by Howe. He was forced to retreat to Saratoga and ultimately surrendered after the Battles of Saratoga. As Washington suspected, Gates' victory emboldened his critics. Biographer John Alden maintains, "It was inevitable that the defeats of Washington's forces and the concurrent victory of the forces in upper New York should be compared." The admiration for Washington was waning, including little credit from John Adams. British commander Howe resigned in May 1778, left America forever, and was replaced by Sir Henry Clinton.

Valley Forge and Monmouth 

Washington's army of 11,000 went into winter quarters at Valley Forge north of Philadelphia in December 1777. They suffered between 2,000 and 3,000 deaths in the extreme cold over six months, mostly from disease and lack of food, clothing, and shelter. Meanwhile, the British were comfortably quartered in Philadelphia, paying for supplies in pounds sterling, while Washington struggled with a devalued American paper currency. The woodlands were soon exhausted of game, and by February, lowered morale and increased desertions ensued.

Washington made repeated petitions to the Continental Congress for provisions. He received a congressional delegation to check the Army's conditions and expressed the urgency of the situation, proclaiming: "Something must be done. Important alterations must be made." He recommended that Congress expedite supplies, and Congress agreed to strengthen and fund the army's supply lines by reorganizing the commissary department. By late February, supplies began arriving.

Baron Friedrich Wilhelm von Steuben's incessant drilling soon transformed Washington's recruits into a disciplined fighting force, and the revitalized army emerged from Valley Forge early the following year. Washington promoted Von Steuben to Major General and made him chief of staff.

In early 1778, the French responded to Burgoyne's defeat and entered into a Treaty of Alliance with the Americans. The Continental Congress ratified the treaty in May, which amounted to a French declaration of war against Britain.

The British evacuated Philadelphia for New York that June and Washington summoned a war council of American and French Generals. He chose a partial attack on the retreating British at the Battle of Monmouth; the British were commanded by Howe's successor General Henry Clinton. Generals Charles Lee and Lafayette moved with 4,000 men, without Washington's knowledge, and bungled their first attack on June 28. Washington relieved Lee and achieved a draw after an expansive battle. At nightfall, the British continued their retreat to New York, and Washington moved his army outside the city. Monmouth was Washington's last battle in the North; he valued the safety of his army more than towns with little value to the British.

West Point espionage

Washington became "America's first spymaster" by designing an espionage system against the British. In 1778, Major Benjamin Tallmadge formed the Culper Ring at Washington's direction to covertly collect information about the British in New York. Washington had disregarded incidents of disloyalty by Benedict Arnold, who had distinguished himself in many battles.

In 1780, Arnold began supplying British spymaster John André with sensitive information intended to compromise Washington and capture West Point, a key American defensive position on the Hudson River. Historians have noted as possible reasons for Arnold's defection to be his anger at losing promotions to junior officers, or repeated slights from Congress. He was also deeply in debt, profiteering from the war, and disappointed by Washington's lack of support during his eventual court-martial.

Arnold repeatedly asked for command of West Point, and Washington finally agreed in August. Arnold met André on September 21, giving him plans to take over the garrison. Militia forces captured André and discovered the plans, but Arnold escaped to New York. Washington recalled the commanders positioned under Arnold at key points around the fort to prevent any complicity, but he did not suspect Arnold's wife Peggy. Washington assumed personal command at West Point and reorganized its defenses. André's trial for espionage ended in a death sentence, and Washington offered to return him to the British in exchange for Arnold, but Clinton refused. André was hanged on October 2, 1780, despite his last request being to face a firing squad, to deter other spies.

Southern theater and Yorktown

In late 1778, General Clinton shipped 3,000 troops from New York to Georgia and launched a Southern invasion against Savannah, reinforced by 2,000 British and Loyalist troops. They repelled an attack by American patriots and French naval forces, which bolstered the British war effort.

In June 1778, Iroquois warriors joined with Loyalist rangers led by Walter Butler and killed more than 200 frontiersmen in June, laying waste to the Wyoming Valley in Pennsylvania. In mid-1779, in response to this and other attacks on New England towns, Washington ordered General John Sullivan to lead an expedition to force the Iroquois out of New York by effecting "the total destruction and devastation" of their villages and by taking their women and children hostage. The expedition systematically destroyed Iroquois villages and food stocks, and forced at least 5,036 Iroquois to flee to British Canada. The campaign directly killed a few hundred Iroquois, but according to anthropologist Anthony F. C. Wallace, the net effect of the campaign was to reduce the Iroquois by half, who became unable to support themselves or survive the harsh winter of 1779–1780. Rhiannon Koehler estimates that as many as 5,500 Iroquois, around 55.5% of the population, may have perished as a result of the campaign, which some historians have described as genocidal.

Washington's troops went into quarters at Morristown, New Jersey during the winter of 1779–1780 and suffered their worst winter of the war, with temperatures well below freezing. New York Harbor was frozen, snow and ice covered the ground for weeks, and the troops again lacked provisions.

Clinton assembled 12,500 troops and attacked Charlestown, South Carolina in January 1780, defeating General Benjamin Lincoln who had only 5,100 Continental troops. The British went on to occupy the South Carolina Piedmont in June, with no Patriot resistance. Clinton returned to New York and left 8,000 troops commanded by General Charles Cornwallis. Congress replaced Lincoln with Horatio Gates; he failed in South Carolina and was replaced by Washington's choice of Nathaniel Greene, but the British already had the South in their grasp. Washington was reinvigorated, however, when Lafayette returned from France with more ships, men, and supplies, and 5,000 veteran French troops led by Marshal Rochambeau arrived at Newport, Rhode Island in July 1780. French naval forces then landed, led by Admiral Grasse, and Washington encouraged Rochambeau to move his fleet south to launch a joint land and naval attack on Arnold's troops.

Washington's army went into winter quarters at New Windsor, New York in December 1780, and Washington urged Congress and state officials to expedite provisions in hopes that the army would not "continue to struggle under the same difficulties they have hitherto endured". On March 1, 1781, Congress ratified the Articles of Confederation, but the government that took effect on March2 did not have the power to levy taxes, and it loosely held the states together.

General Clinton sent Benedict Arnold, now a British Brigadier General with 1,700 troops, to Virginia to capture Portsmouth and conduct raids on Patriot forces from there; Washington responded by sending Lafayette south to counter Arnold's efforts. Washington initially hoped to bring the fight to New York, drawing off British forces from Virginia and ending the war there, but Rochambeau advised Grasse that Cornwallis in Virginia was the better target. Grasse's fleet arrived off the Virginia coast, and Washington saw the advantage. He made a feint towards Clinton in New York, then headed south to Virginia.

The siege of Yorktown was a decisive Allied victory by the combined forces of the Continental Army commanded by General Washington, the French Army commanded by the General Comte de Rochambeau, and the French Navy commanded by Admiral de Grasse, in the defeat of Cornwallis' British forces. On August 19, the march to Yorktown led by Washington and Rochambeau began, which is known now as the "celebrated march". Washington was in command of an army of 7,800 Frenchmen, 3,100 militia, and 8,000 Continentals. Not well experienced in siege warfare, Washington often referred to the judgment of General Rochambeau and used his advice about how to proceed; however, Rochambeau never challenged Washington's authority as the battle's commanding officer.

By late September, Patriot-French forces surrounded Yorktown, trapped the British Army, and prevented British reinforcements from Clinton in the North, while the French navy emerged victorious at the Battle of the Chesapeake. The final American offensive was begun with a shot fired by Washington. The siege ended with a British surrender on October 19, 1781; over 7,000 British soldiers were made prisoners of war, in the last major land battle of the American Revolutionary War. Washington negotiated the terms of surrender for two days, and the official signing ceremony took place on October 19; Cornwallis claimed illness and was absent, sending General Charles O'Hara as his proxy. As a gesture of goodwill, Washington held a dinner for the American, French, and British generals, all of whom fraternized on friendly terms and identified with one another as members of the same professional military caste.

Asgill Affair

After the surrender at Yorktown, a situation developed that threatened relations between the newly independent America and Britain. Following a series of retributive executions between Patriots and Loyalists, Washington, in May 1782, wrote in a letter to General Moses Hazen that a British captain should be executed in retaliation for the execution of Joshua Huddy, a Patriot captain, who was hanged at the direction of the Loyalist Richard Lippincott. Washington initially had wanted Lippincott himself to be executed but was rebuffed. Later that same month, Charles Asgill was chosen from amongst 13 British Captains by the drawing of lots from a hat. This was a violation of the 14th article of the Yorktown Articles of Capitulation, which protected prisoners of war from acts of retaliation. Washington's feelings on matters soon changed, declaring in a June letter to General Elias Dayton, "I most devoutly Wish his Life may be saved." Nonetheless, Washington refused to reconsider the death sentence. Rather, he passed on the responsibility of determining Asgill's fate to the Continental Congress. After much consideration, and due in large measure to appeals from French Foreign Minister, the comte de Vergennes, Asgill was released to return to England in November 1782. Peter Henriques writes that the Asgill Affair "could have left an ugly blot on George Washington's reputation", calling it "a blip that reminds us even the greatest of men make mistakes".

Demobilization and resignation 

When peace negotiations began in April 1782, both the British and French began gradually evacuating their forces. The American treasury was empty, unpaid, and mutinous soldiers forced the adjournment of Congress, and Washington dispelled unrest by suppressing the Newburgh Conspiracy in March 1783; Congress promised officers a five-year bonus. Washington submitted an account of $450,000 in expenses which he had advanced to the army. The account was settled, though it was allegedly vague about large sums and included expenses his wife had incurred through visits to his headquarters.

The following month, a Congressional committee led by Alexander Hamilton began adapting the army for peacetime. In August 1783, Washington gave the Army's perspective to the committee in his Sentiments on a Peace Establishment, which advised Congress to keep a standing army, create a "national militia" of separate state units, and establish a navy and a national military academy.

The Treaty of Paris was signed on September 3, 1783, and Great Britain officially recognized the independence of the United States. Washington then disbanded his army, giving a farewell address to his soldiers on November 2. During this time, Washington oversaw the evacuation of British forces in New York and was greeted by parades and celebrations. There he announced that Colonel Henry Knox had been promoted commander-in-chief. Washington and Governor George Clinton took formal possession of the city on November 25.

In early December 1783, Washington bade farewell to his officers at Fraunces Tavern and resigned as commander-in-chief soon thereafter, refuting Loyalist predictions that he would not relinquish his military command. In a final appearance in uniform, he gave a statement to the Congress: "I consider it an indispensable duty to close this last solemn act of my official life, by commending the interests of our dearest country to the protection of Almighty God, and those who have the superintendence of them, to his holy keeping." Washington's resignation was acclaimed at home and abroad and showed a skeptical world that the new republic would not degenerate into chaos.

The same month, Washington was appointed president-general of the Society of the Cincinnati, a newly established hereditary fraternity of Revolutionary War officers. He served in this capacity for the remainder of his life.

Early republic (1783–1789)

Return to Mount Vernon 

Washington was longing to return home after spending just ten days at Mount Vernon out of  years of war. He arrived on Christmas Eve, delighted to be "free of the bustle of a camp and the busy scenes of public life". He was a celebrity and was fêted during a visit to his mother at Fredericksburg in February 1784, and he received a constant stream of visitors wishing to pay their respects to him at Mount Vernon.

Washington reactivated his interests in the Great Dismal Swamp and Potomac canal projects begun before the war, though neither paid him any dividends, and he undertook a 34-day,  trip to check on his land holdings in the Ohio Country. He oversaw the completion of the remodeling work at Mount Vernon, which transformed his residence into the mansion that survives to this day—although his financial situation was not strong. Creditors paid him in depreciated wartime currency, and he owed significant amounts in taxes and wages. Mount Vernon had made no profit during his absence, and he saw persistently poor crop yields due to pestilence and poor weather. His estate recorded its eleventh year running at a deficit in 1787, and there was little prospect of improvement. Washington undertook a new landscaping plan and succeeded in cultivating a range of fast-growing trees and shrubs that were native to North America. He also began breeding mules after having been gifted a Spanish jack by King Charles III of Spain in 1784. There were few mules in the United States at that time, and he believed that properly bred mules would revolutionize agriculture and transportation.

Constitutional Convention of 1787 

Before returning to private life in June 1783, Washington called for a strong union. Though he was concerned that he might be criticized for meddling in civil matters, he sent a circular letter to all the states, maintaining that the Articles of Confederation was no more than "a rope of sand" linking the states. He believed the nation was on the verge of "anarchy and confusion", was vulnerable to foreign intervention, and that a national constitution would unify the states under a strong central government. When Shays' Rebellion erupted in Massachusetts on August 29, 1786, over taxation, Washington was further convinced that a national constitution was needed. Some nationalists feared that the new republic had descended into lawlessness, and they met together on September 11, 1786, at Annapolis to ask Congress to revise the Articles of Confederation. One of their biggest efforts, however, was getting Washington to attend. Congress agreed to a Constitutional Convention to be held in Philadelphia in Spring 1787, and each state was to send delegates.

On December 4, 1786, Washington was chosen to lead the Virginia delegation, but he declined on December 21. He had concerns about the legality of the convention and consulted James Madison, Henry Knox, and others. They persuaded him to attend it, however, as his presence might induce reluctant states to send delegates and smooth the way for the ratification process. On March 28, Washington told Governor Edmund Randolph that he would attend the convention but made it clear that he was urged to attend.

Washington arrived in Philadelphia on May 9, 1787, though a quorum was not attained until Friday, May 25. Benjamin Franklin nominated Washington to preside over the convention, and he was unanimously elected to serve as president general. The convention's state-mandated purpose was to revise the Articles of Confederation with "all such alterations and further provisions" required to improve them, and the new government would be established when the resulting document was "duly confirmed by the several states". Governor Edmund Randolph of Virginia introduced Madison's Virginia Plan on May 27, the third day of the convention. It called for an entirely new constitution and a sovereign national government, which Washington highly recommended.

Washington wrote Alexander Hamilton on July 10: "I almost despair of seeing a favorable issue to the proceedings of our convention and do therefore repent having had any agency in the business." Nevertheless, he lent his prestige to the goodwill and work of the other delegates. He unsuccessfully lobbied many to support ratification of the Constitution, such as anti-federalist Patrick Henry; Washington told him "the adoption of it under the present circumstances of the Union is in my opinion desirable" and declared the alternative would be anarchy. Washington and Madison then spent four days at Mount Vernon evaluating the new government's transition.

Chancellor of William & Mary 
In 1788, the Board of Visitors of the College of William & Mary decided to re-establish the position of Chancellor, and elected Washington to the office on January 18. The College Rector Samuel Griffin wrote to Washington inviting him to the post, and in a letter dated April 30, 1788, Washington accepted the position of the 14th Chancellor of the College of William & Mary. He continued to serve in the post through his presidency until his death on December 14, 1799.

First presidential election 

The delegates to the Convention anticipated a Washington presidency and left it to him to define the office once elected. The state electors under the Constitution voted for the president on February 4, 1789, and Washington suspected that most republicans had not voted for him. The mandated March4 date passed without a Congressional quorum to count the votes, but a quorum was reached on April 5. The votes were tallied the next day, and Congressional Secretary Charles Thomson was sent to Mount Vernon to tell Washington he had been elected president. Washington won the majority of every state's electoral votes; John Adams received the next highest number of votes and therefore became vice president. Washington had "anxious and painful sensations" about leaving the "domestic felicity" of Mount Vernon, but departed for New York City on April 16 to be inaugurated.

Presidency (1789–1797) 

Washington was inaugurated on April 30, 1789, taking the oath of office at Federal Hall in New York City. His coach was led by militia and a marching band and followed by statesmen and foreign dignitaries in an inaugural parade, with a crowd of 10,000. Chancellor Robert R. Livingston administered the oath, using a Bible provided by the Masons, after which the militia fired a 13-gun salute. Washington read a speech in the Senate Chamber, asking "that Almighty Being who rules over the universe, who presides in the councils of nations—and whose providential aids can supply every human defect, consecrate the liberties and happiness of the people of the United States". Though he wished to serve without a salary, Congress insisted adamantly that he accept it, later providing Washington $25,000 per year to defray costs of the presidency.

Washington wrote to James Madison: "As the first of everything in our situation will serve to establish a precedent, it is devoutly wished on my part that these precedents be fixed on true principles." To that end, he preferred the title "Mr. President" over more majestic names proposed by the Senate, including "His Excellency" and "His Highness the President". His executive precedents included the inaugural address, messages to Congress, and the cabinet form of the executive branch.

Washington planned to resign after his first term, but the political strife in the nation convinced him he should remain in office. He was an able administrator and a judge of talent and character, and he regularly talked with department heads to get their advice. He tolerated opposing views, despite fears that a democratic system would lead to political violence, and he conducted a smooth transition of power to his successor. He remained non-partisan throughout his presidency and opposed the divisiveness of political parties, but he favored a strong central government, was sympathetic to a Federalist form of government, and leery of the Republican opposition.

Washington dealt with major problems. The old Confederation lacked the powers to handle its workload and had weak leadership, no executive, a small bureaucracy of clerks, a large debt, worthless paper money, and no power to establish taxes. He had the task of assembling an executive department and relied on Tobias Lear for advice selecting its officers. Great Britain refused to relinquish its forts in the American West, and Barbary pirates preyed on American merchant ships in the Mediterranean before the United States even had a navy.

Cabinet and executive departments 

Congress created executive departments in 1789, including the State Department in July, the War Department in August, and the Treasury Department in September. Washington appointed fellow Virginian Edmund Randolph as Attorney General, Samuel Osgood as Postmaster General, Thomas Jefferson as Secretary of State, and Henry Knox as Secretary of War. Finally, he appointed Alexander Hamilton as Secretary of the Treasury. Washington's cabinet became a consulting and advisory body, not mandated by the Constitution.

Washington's cabinet members formed rival parties with sharply opposing views, most fiercely illustrated between Hamilton and Jefferson. Washington restricted cabinet discussions to topics of his choosing, without participating in the debate. He occasionally requested cabinet opinions in writing and expected department heads to agreeably carry out his decisions.

Domestic issues 

Washington was apolitical and opposed the formation of parties, suspecting that conflict would undermine republicanism. He exercised great restraint in using his veto power, writing that "I give my Signature to many Bills with which my Judgment is at variance…."

His closest advisors formed two factions, portending the First Party System. Secretary of the Treasury Alexander Hamilton formed the Federalist Party to promote national credit and a financially powerful nation. Secretary of State Thomas Jefferson opposed Hamilton's agenda and founded the Jeffersonian Republicans. Washington favored Hamilton's agenda, however, and it ultimately went into effect—resulting in bitter controversy.

Washington proclaimed November 26, 1789, as a day of Thanksgiving to encourage national unity. "It is the duty of all nations to acknowledge the providence of Almighty God, to obey His will, to be grateful for His benefits, and humbly to implore His protection and favor." He spent that day fasting and visiting debtors in prison to provide them with food and beer.

African Americans 

In response to two antislavery petitions that were presented to Congress in 1790, slaveholders in Georgia and South Carolina objected and threatened to "blow the trumpet of civil war". Washington and Congress responded with a series of racist measures: naturalized citizenship was denied to black immigrants; blacks were barred from serving in state militias; the Southwest Territory that would soon become the state of Tennessee was permitted to maintain slavery; and two more slave states were admitted (Kentucky in 1792 and Tennessee in 1796). On February 12, 1793, Washington signed into law the Fugitive Slave Act, which overrode state laws and courts, allowing agents to cross state lines to capture and return escaped slaves. Many free blacks in the north decried the law believing it would allow bounty hunting and the kidnappings of blacks. The Fugitive Slave Act gave effect to the Constitution's Fugitive Slave Clause, and the Act was passed overwhelmingly in Congress (e.g. the vote was 48 to 7 in the House).

On the anti-slavery side of the ledger, Washington signed a reenactment of the Northwest Ordinance in 1789, which had freed all slaves brought after 1787 into a vast expanse of federal territory north of the Ohio River, except for slaves escaping from slave states. That 1787 law lapsed when the new U.S. Constitution was ratified in 1789. The Slave Trade Act of 1794, which sharply limited American involvement in the Atlantic slave trade, was also signed by Washington. Congress also acted on February 18, 1791, to admit the free state of Vermont into the Union as the 14th state as of March 4, 1791.

National Bank 

Washington's first term was largely devoted to economic concerns, in which Hamilton had devised various plans to address matters. The establishment of public credit became a primary challenge for the federal government. Hamilton submitted a report to a deadlocked Congress, and he, Madison, and Jefferson reached the Compromise of 1790 in which Jefferson agreed to Hamilton's debt proposals in exchange for moving the nation's capital temporarily to Philadelphia and then south near Georgetown on the Potomac River. The terms were legislated in the Funding Act of 1790 and the Residence Act, both of which Washington signed into law. Congress authorized the assumption and payment of the nation's debts, with funding provided by customs duties and excise taxes.

Hamilton caused controversy among Cabinet members by advocating for the establishment of the First Bank of the United States. Madison and Jefferson objected to the idea, but legislation creating the bank easily passed Congress. Jefferson and Randolph insisted the federal government was going beyond its constitutional authority by establishing the new bank. Hamilton argued the government could charter the bank under the implied powers granted by the constitution. Washington sided with Hamilton and signed the bank legislation on February 25, 1791. Meanwhile, the rift between Hamilton and Jefferson became openly hostile.

The nation's first financial crisis occurred in March 1792. Hamilton's Federalists exploited large loans to gain control of U.S. debt securities, causing a run on the national bank; the markets returned to normal by mid-April. Jefferson believed Hamilton was part of the scheme, despite Hamilton's efforts to ameliorate, and Washington again found himself in the middle of a feud.

Jefferson–Hamilton feud 

Jefferson and Hamilton adopted diametrically opposed political principles. Hamilton believed in a strong national government requiring a national bank and foreign loans to function, while Jefferson believed the states and the farm element should primarily direct the government; he also resented the idea of banks and foreign loans. To Washington's dismay, the two men persistently entered into disputes and infighting. Hamilton demanded that Jefferson resign if he could not support Washington, and Jefferson told Washington that Hamilton's fiscal system would lead to the overthrow of the republic. Washington urged them to call a truce for the nation's sake, but they ignored him.

Washington reversed his decision to retire after his first term to minimize party strife, but the feud continued after his re-election. Jefferson's political actions, his support of Freneau's National Gazette, and his attempt to undermine Hamilton nearly led Washington to dismiss him from the cabinet; Jefferson ultimately resigned his position in December 1793, and Washington forsook him from that time on.

The feud led to the well-defined Federalist and Republican parties, and party affiliation became necessary for election to Congress by 1794. Washington remained aloof from congressional attacks on Hamilton, but he did not publicly protect him, either. The Hamilton–Reynolds sex scandal opened Hamilton to disgrace, but Washington continued to hold him in "very high esteem" as the dominant force in establishing federal law and government.

Whiskey Rebellion 

In March 1791, at Hamilton's urging, with support from Madison, Congress imposed an excise tax on distilled spirits to help curtail the national debt, which took effect in July. Grain farmers strongly protested in Pennsylvania's frontier districts; they argued that they were unrepresented and were shouldering too much of the debt, comparing their situation to excessive British taxation before the Revolutionary War. On August 2, Washington assembled his cabinet to discuss how to deal with the situation. Unlike Washington, who had reservations about using force, Hamilton had long waited for such a situation and was eager to suppress the rebellion by using federal authority and force. Not wanting to involve the federal government if possible, Washington called on Pennsylvania state officials to take the initiative, but they declined to take military action. On August 7, Washington issued his first proclamation for calling up state militias. After appealing for peace, he reminded the protestors that, unlike the rule of the British crown, the Federal law was issued by state-elected representatives.

Threats and violence against tax collectors, however, escalated into defiance against federal authority in 1794 and gave rise to the Whiskey Rebellion. Washington issued a final proclamation on September 25, threatening the use of military force to no avail. The federal army was not up to the task, so Washington invoked the Militia Act of 1792 to summon state militias. Governors sent troops, initially commanded by Washington, who gave the command to Light-Horse Harry Lee to lead them into the rebellious districts. They took 150 prisoners, and the remaining rebels dispersed without further fighting. Two of the prisoners were condemned to death, but Washington exercised his Constitutional authority for the first time and pardoned them.

Washington's forceful action demonstrated that the new government could protect itself and its tax collectors. This represented the first use of federal military force against the states and citizens, and remains the only time an incumbent president has commanded troops in the field. Washington justified his action against "certain self-created societies", which he regarded as "subversive organizations" that threatened the national union. He did not dispute their right to protest, but he insisted that their dissent must not violate federal law. Congress agreed and extended their congratulations to him; only Madison and Jefferson expressed indifference.

Foreign affairs 

In April 1792, the French Revolutionary Wars began between Great Britain and France, and Washington declared America's neutrality. The revolutionary government of France sent diplomat Edmond-Charles Genêt to America, and he was welcomed with great enthusiasm. He created a network of new Democratic-Republican Societies promoting France's interests, but Washington denounced them and demanded that the French recall Genêt. The National Assembly of France granted Washington honorary French citizenship on August 26, 1792, during the early stages of the French Revolution. Hamilton formulated the Jay Treaty to normalize trade relations with Great Britain while removing them from western forts, and also to resolve financial debts remaining from the Revolution. Chief Justice John Jay acted as Washington's negotiator and signed the treaty on November 19, 1794; critical Jeffersonians, however, supported France. Washington deliberated, then supported the treaty because it avoided war with Britain, but was disappointed that its provisions favored Britain. He mobilized public opinion and secured ratification in the Senate but faced frequent public criticism.

The British agreed to abandon their forts around the Great Lakes, and the United States modified the boundary with Canada. The government liquidated numerous pre-Revolutionary War debts, and the British opened the British West Indies to American trade. The treaty secured peace with Britain and a decade of prosperous trade. Jefferson claimed that it angered France and "invited rather than avoided" war. Relations with France deteriorated afterward, leaving succeeding president John Adams with prospective war. James Monroe was the American Minister to France, but Washington recalled him for his opposition to the Treaty. The French refused to accept his replacement Charles Cotesworth Pinckney, and the French Directory declared the authority to seize American ships two days before Washington's term ended.

Native American affairs 

Ron Chernow describes Washington as always trying to be even-handed in dealing with the Natives. He states that Washington hoped they would abandon their itinerant hunting life and adapt to fixed agricultural communities in the manner of white settlers. He also maintains that Washington never advocated outright confiscation of tribal land or the forcible removal of tribes and that he berated American settlers who abused natives, admitting that he held out no hope for pacific relations with the natives as long as "frontier settlers entertain the opinion that there is not the same crime (or indeed no crime at all) in killing a native as in killing a white man."

By contrast, Colin G. Calloway writes that, "Washington had a lifelong obsession with getting Indian land, either for himself or for his nation, and initiated policies and campaigns that had devastating effects in Indian country." "The growth of the nation," Galloway has stated, "demanded the dispossession of Indian people. Washington hoped the process could be bloodless and that Indian people would give up their lands for a "fair" price and move away. But if Indians refused and resisted, as they often did, he felt he had no choice but to "extirpate" them and that the expeditions he sent to destroy Indian towns were therefore entirely justified."

During the fall of 1789, Washington had to contend with the British refusing to evacuate their forts in the Northwest frontier and their concerted efforts to incite Indian tribes to attack American settlers. The Northwest tribes under Miami chief Little Turtle allied with the British Army to resist American expansion, and killed 1,500 settlers between 1783 and 1790.

As documented by Harless in 2018, Washington declared that, "the Government of the United States are determined that their Administration of Indian Affairs shall be directed entirely by the great principles of Justice and humanity", and provided that treaties should negotiate their land interests. The administration regarded powerful tribes as foreign nations, and Washington even smoked a peace pipe and drank wine with them at the Philadelphia presidential house. He made numerous attempts to conciliate them; he equated killing indigenous peoples with killing whites and sought to integrate them into European American culture. Secretary of War Henry Knox also attempted to encourage agriculture amongst non-agriculturalist tribes.

In the Southwest, negotiations failed between federal commissioners and raiding Indian tribes seeking retribution. Washington invited Creek Chief Alexander McGillivray and 24 leading chiefs to New York to negotiate a treaty and treated them like foreign dignitaries. Knox and McGillivray concluded the Treaty of New York on August 7, 1790, in Federal Hall, which provided the tribes with agricultural supplies and McGillivray with the rank of Brigadier General and an annual salary of $1,200.

In 1790, Washington sent Brigadier General Josiah Harmar to pacify the Northwest tribes, but Little Turtle routed him twice and forced him to withdraw. The Northwestern Confederacy of tribes used guerrilla tactics and were an effective force against the sparsely manned American Army. Washington sent Major General Arthur St. Clair from Fort Washington on an expedition to restore peace in the territory in 1791. On November 4, St. Clair's forces were ambushed and soundly defeated by tribal forces with few survivors, despite Washington's warning of surprise attacks. Washington was outraged over what he viewed to be excessive Native American brutality and execution of captives, including women and children.

St. Clair resigned his commission, and Washington replaced him with the Revolutionary War hero Major General Anthony Wayne. From 1792 to 1793, Wayne instructed his troops on Native American warfare tactics and instilled discipline which was lacking under St. Clair. In August 1794, Washington sent Wayne into tribal territory with authority to drive them out by burning their villages and crops in the Maumee Valley. On August 24, the American army under Wayne's leadership defeated the Northwestern Confederacy at the Battle of Fallen Timbers, and the Treaty of Greenville in August 1795 opened up two-thirds of the Ohio Country for American settlement.

Second term 

Washington initially planned to retire after his first term, while many Americans could not imagine anyone else taking his place. After nearly four years as president, and dealing with the infighting in his own cabinet and with partisan critics, Washington showed little enthusiasm in running for a second term, while Martha also wanted him not to run. James Madison urged him not to retire, that his absence would only allow the dangerous political rift in his cabinet and the House to worsen. Jefferson also pleaded with him not to retire and agreed to drop his attacks on Hamilton, or he would also retire if Washington did. Hamilton maintained that Washington's absence would be "deplored as the greatest evil" to the country at this time. Washington's close nephew George Augustine Washington, his manager at Mount Vernon, was critically ill and had to be replaced, further increasing Washington's desire to retire and return to Mount Vernon.

When the election of 1792 neared, Washington did not publicly announce his presidential candidacy. Still, he silently consented to run to prevent a further political-personal rift in his cabinet. The Electoral College unanimously elected him president on February 13, 1793, and John Adams as vice president by a vote of 77 to 50. Washington, with nominal fanfare, arrived alone at his inauguration in his carriage. Sworn into office by Associate Justice William Cushing on March 4, 1793, in the Senate Chamber of Congress Hall in Philadelphia, Washington gave a brief address and then immediately retired to his Philadelphia presidential house, weary of office and in poor health.

On April 22, 1793, during the French Revolution, Washington issued his famous Neutrality Proclamation and was resolved to pursue "a conduct friendly and impartial toward the belligerent Powers" while he warned Americans not to intervene in the international conflict.  Although Washington recognized France's revolutionary government, he would eventually ask French minister to the United States Edmond-Charles Genêt be recalled over the Citizen Genêt affair. Genêt was a diplomatic troublemaker who was openly hostile toward Washington's neutrality policy. He procured four American ships as privateers to strike at Spanish forces (British allies) in Florida while organizing militias to strike at other British possessions. However, his efforts failed to draw America into the foreign campaigns during Washington's presidency. On July 31, 1793, Jefferson submitted his resignation from Washington's cabinet. Washington signed the Naval Act of 1794 and commissioned the first six federal frigates to combat Barbary pirates.

In January 1795, Hamilton, who desired more income for his family, resigned from office and was replaced by Washington appointment Oliver Wolcott Jr. Washington and Hamilton remained friends. However, Washington's relationship with his Secretary of War Henry Knox deteriorated. Knox resigned from office due to a rumor that he profited from contracts for the construction of U.S. frigates.

In the final months of his presidency, Washington was assailed by his political foes and a partisan press who accused him of being ambitious and greedy, while he argued that he had taken no salary during the war and had risked his life in battle. He regarded the press as a disuniting, "diabolical" force of falsehoods, sentiments that he expressed in his Farewell Address. At the end of his second term, Washington retired for personal and political reasons, dismayed with personal attacks, and to ensure that a truly contested presidential election could be held. He did not feel bound to a two-term limit, but his retirement set a significant precedent. Washington is often credited with setting the principle of a two-term presidency, but it was Thomas Jefferson who first refused to run for a third term on political grounds.

Farewell Address 

In 1796, Washington declined to run for a third term of office, believing his death in office would create an image of a lifetime appointment. His retirement established a precedent for a two-term limit on the U.S. presidency. In May 1792, in anticipation of his retirement, Washington instructed James Madison to prepare a "valedictory address", an initial draft of which was entitled the "Farewell Address". In May 1796, Washington sent the manuscript to his Secretary of Treasury Alexander Hamilton who did an extensive rewrite, while Washington provided final edits. On September 19, 1796, David Claypoole's American Daily Advertiser published the final version of the address.

Washington stressed that national identity was paramount, while a united America would safeguard freedom and prosperity. He warned the nation of three eminent dangers: regionalism, partisanship, and foreign entanglements, and said the "name of AMERICAN, which belongs to you, in your national capacity, must always exalt the just pride of patriotism, more than any appellation derived from local discriminations." Washington called for men to move beyond partisanship for the common good, stressing that the United States must concentrate on its own interests. He warned against foreign alliances and their influence in domestic affairs, and bitter partisanship and the dangers of political parties. He counseled friendship and commerce with all nations, but advised against involvement in European wars. He stressed the importance of religion, asserting that "religion and morality are indispensable supports" in a republic. Washington's address favored Hamilton's Federalist ideology and economic policies.

Washington closed the address by reflecting on his legacy:

After initial publication, many Republicans, including Madison, criticized the Address and believed it was an anti-French campaign document. Madison believed Washington was strongly pro-British. Madison also was suspicious of who authored the Address.

In 1839, Washington biographer Jared Sparks maintained that Washington's "...Farewell Address was printed and published with the laws, by order of the legislatures, as an evidence of the value they attached to its political precepts, and of their affection for its author." In 1972, Washington scholar James Flexner referred to the Farewell Address as receiving as much acclaim as Thomas Jefferson's Declaration of Independence and Abraham Lincoln's Gettysburg Address. In 2010, historian Ron Chernow reported the Farewell Address proved to be one of the most influential statements on republicanism.

Post-presidency (1797–1799)

Retirement

Washington retired to Mount Vernon in March 1797 and devoted time to his plantations and other business interests, including his distillery. His plantation operations were only minimally profitable, and his lands in the west (Piedmont) were under Indian attacks and yielded little income, with the squatters there refusing to pay rent. He attempted to sell these but without success. He became an even more committed Federalist. He vocally supported the Alien and Sedition Acts and convinced Federalist John Marshall to run for Congress to weaken the Jeffersonian hold on Virginia.

Washington grew restless in retirement, prompted by tensions with France, and he wrote to Secretary of War James McHenry offering to organize President Adams' army. In a continuation of the French Revolutionary Wars, French privateers began seizing American ships in 1798, and relations deteriorated with France and led to the "Quasi-War". Without consulting Washington, Adams nominated him for a lieutenant general commission on July 4, 1798, and the position of commander-in-chief of the armies. Washington chose to accept, and he served as the commanding general from July 13, 1798, until his death 17 months later. He participated in planning for a provisional army, but he avoided involvement in details. In advising McHenry of potential officers for the army, he appeared to make a complete break with Jefferson's Democratic-Republicans: "you could as soon scrub the blackamoor white, as to change the principles of a profest Democrat; and that he will leave nothing unattempted to overturn the government of this country." Washington delegated the active leadership of the army to Hamilton, a major general. No army invaded the United States during this period, and Washington did not assume a field command.

Washington was known to be rich because of the well-known "glorified façade of wealth and grandeur" at Mount Vernon, but nearly all his wealth was in the form of land and slaves rather than ready cash. To supplement his income, he erected a distillery for substantial whiskey production. Historians estimate that the estate was worth about $1million in 1799 dollars, . He bought land parcels to spur development around the new Federal City named in his honor, and he sold individual lots to middle-income investors rather than multiple lots to large investors, believing they would more likely commit to making improvements.

Final days and death 

On December 12, 1799, Washington inspected his farms on horseback. He returned home late and had guests over for dinner. He had a sore throat the next day but was well enough to mark trees for cutting. That evening, Washington complained of chest congestion but was still cheerful. On Saturday, however, he awoke to an inflamed throat and difficulty breathing and ordered estate overseer George Rawlins to remove nearly a pint of his blood; bloodletting was a common practice of the time. His family summoned Drs. James Craik, Gustavus Richard Brown, and Elisha C. Dick. Dr. William Thornton arrived some hours after Washington died.

Dr. Brown initially believed Washington had quinsy; Dr. Dick thought the condition was a more serious "violent inflammation of the throat". They continued the process of bloodletting to approximately five pints, but Washington's condition deteriorated further. Dr. Dick proposed a tracheotomy, but the other physicians were not familiar with that procedure and therefore disapproved. Washington instructed Brown and Dick to leave the room, while he assured Craik, "Doctor, I die hard, but I am not afraid to go."

Washington's death came more swiftly than expected. On his deathbed, out of fear of being entombed alive, he instructed his private secretary Tobias Lear to wait three days before his burial. According to Lear, Washington died between 10 p.m. and 11 p.m. on December 14, 1799, with Martha seated at the foot of his bed. His last words were "'Tis well", from his conversation with Lear about his burial. He was 67.

Congress immediately adjourned for the day upon news of Washington's death, and the Speaker's chair was shroud in black the next morning. The funeral was held four days after his death on December 18, 1799, at Mount Vernon, where his body was interred. Cavalry and foot soldiers led the procession, and six colonels served as the pallbearers. The Mount Vernon funeral service was restricted mostly to family and friends. Reverend Thomas Davis read the funeral service by the vault with a brief address, followed by a ceremony performed by various members of Washington's Masonic lodge in Alexandria, Virginia. Congress chose Light-Horse Harry Lee to deliver the eulogy. Word of his death traveled slowly; church bells rang in the cities, and many places of business closed. People worldwide admired Washington and were saddened by his death, and memorial processions were held in major cities of the United States. Martha wore a black mourning cape for one year, and she burned their correspondence to protect their privacy. Only five letters between the couple are known to have survived: two from Martha to George and three from him to her.

The diagnosis of Washington's illness and the immediate cause of his death have been subjects of debate since his death. The published account of Drs. Craik and Brown stated that his symptoms had been consistent with cynanche trachealis, a term of the period used to describe severe inflammation of the upper windpipe, including quinsy. Accusations have persisted since Washington's death concerning medical malpractice with some believing he had been bled to death from his bloodletting treatments. Various modern medical authors have speculated that he died from a severe case of epiglottitis complicated by the treatments, most notably the massive blood loss that almost certainly caused hypovolemic shock.

Burial, net worth, and aftermath 

Washington was buried in the old Washington family vault at Mount Vernon, situated on a grassy slope overspread with willow, juniper, cypress, and chestnut trees. It contained the remains of his brother Lawrence and other family members, but the decrepit brick vault needed repair, prompting Washington to leave instructions in his will for the construction of a new vault. Washington's estate at the time of his death was worth an estimated $780,000 in 1799, approximately equivalent to $19.68 million in 2023. Washington's peak net worth was $587.0 million, including his 300 slaves. Washington held title to more than 65,000 acres of land in 37 different locations.

In 1830, a disgruntled ex-employee of the estate attempted to steal what he thought was Washington's skull, prompting the construction of a more secure vault. The next year, the new vault was constructed at Mount Vernon to receive the remains of George and Martha and other relatives. In 1832, a joint Congressional committee debated moving his body from Mount Vernon to a crypt in the Capitol. The crypt had been built by architect Charles Bulfinch in the 1820s during the reconstruction of the burned-out capital, after the Burning of Washington by the British during the War of 1812. Southern opposition was intense, antagonized by an ever-growing rift between North and South; many were concerned that Washington's remains could end up on "a shore foreign to his native soil" if the country became divided, and Washington's remains stayed in Mount Vernon.

On October 7, 1837, Washington's remains were placed, still in the original lead coffin, within a marble sarcophagus designed by William Strickland and constructed by John Struthers earlier that year. The sarcophagus was sealed and encased with planks, and an outer vault was constructed around it. The outer vault has the sarcophagi of both George and Martha Washington; the inner vault has the remains of other Washington family members and relatives.

Personal life 

Washington was somewhat reserved in personality, but he generally had a strong presence among others. He made speeches and announcements when required, but he was not a noted orator or debater. He had grey-blue eyes and long reddish-brown hair. He did not wear a powdered wig; instead he wore his hair curled, powdered, and tied in a queue in the fashion of the day.

Washington frequently suffered from severe tooth decay and ultimately lost all his teeth but one. He had several sets of false teeth which he wore during his presidency. Contrary to common lore, these were not made of wood, but of metal, ivory, bone, animal teeth, and human teeth possibly obtained from slaves. These dental problems left him in constant pain, which he treated with laudanum. As a public figure, he relied on the strict confidence of his dentist.

Washington was a talented equestrian early in life. He collected thoroughbreds at Mount Vernon, and his two favorite horses were Blueskin and Nelson. Fellow Virginian Thomas Jefferson said Washington was "the best horseman of his age and the most graceful figure that could be seen on horseback"; he also hunted foxes, deer, ducks, and other game. He was an excellent dancer and frequently attended the theater. He drank alcohol in moderation but was morally opposed to excessive drinking, smoking tobacco, gambling, and profanity.

Religion and Freemasonry 

Washington was descended from Anglican minister Lawrence Washington, who was his great-great-grandfather and whose troubles with the Church of England may have prompted his heirs to emigrate to America. Washington was baptized as an infant in April 1732 and became a devoted member of the Church of England, also known as the Anglican Church. He served more than 20 years as a vestryman and churchwarden at Fairfax Parish and Truco Parish in Virginia. He privately prayed and read the Bible daily, and he publicly encouraged people and the nation to pray. He may have taken communion on a regular basis prior to the Revolutionary War, but he did not do so following the war and was admonished by Pastor James Abercrombie for failing to do so.

Washington believed in a "wise, inscrutable, and irresistible" Creator God who was active in the Universe, contrary to deistic thought. He referred to God in Enlightenment terms, including Providence, the Creator, or the Almighty, and the Divine Author or Supreme Being. He believed in a divine power who watched over battlefields, was involved in the outcome of war, was protecting his life, and was involved in American politics and specifically the creation of the United States. Modern historian Ron Chernow has argued that Washington avoided evangelistic Christianity or hellfire-and-brimstone speech along with communion and anything inclined to "flaunt his religiosity". Chernow has said Washington "never used his religion as a device for partisan purposes or in official undertakings". No mention of Jesus Christ appears in his private correspondence, and such references are rare in his public writings. However, Washington frequently quoted from the Bible or paraphrased it, and often referred to the Anglican Book of Common Prayer. There is debate on whether he is best classed as a Christian or a theistic rationalist—or both.

Washington emphasized religious toleration in a nation with numerous denominations and religions. He publicly attended services of different Christian denominations and prohibited anti-Catholic celebrations in the Army. He engaged workers at Mount Vernon without regard for religious belief or affiliation. While president, he acknowledged major religious sects and gave speeches on religious toleration. He was distinctly rooted in the ideas, values, and modes of thinking of the Enlightenment, but he harbored no contempt of organized Christianity and its clergy, "being no bigot myself to any mode of worship". In 1793, speaking to members of the New Church in Baltimore, Washington said, "We have abundant reason to rejoice that in this Land the light of truth and reason has triumphed over the power of bigotry and superstition."

Freemasonry was a widely accepted institution in the late 18th century, known for advocating moral teachings. Washington was attracted to the Masons' dedication to the Enlightenment principles of rationality, reason, and brotherhood. American Masonic lodges did not share the anti-clerical perspective of the controversial European lodges. A Masonic lodge was established in Fredericksburg, Virginia in September 1752, and Washington was initiated two months later at the age of 20 as one of its first Entered Apprentices. Within a year, he progressed through its ranks to become a Master Mason. Washington had high regard for the Masonic Order, but his personal lodge attendance was sporadic. In 1777, a convention of Virginia lodges asked him to be the Grand Master of the newly established Grand Lodge of Virginia, but he declined due to his commitments leading the Continental Army. After 1782, he frequently corresponded with Masonic lodges and members, and he was listed as Master in the Virginia charter of Alexandria Lodge No. 22 in 1788.

Slavery 

In Washington's lifetime, slavery was deeply ingrained in the economic and social fabric of Virginia. Slavery was legal in all of the Thirteen Colonies prior to the American Revolution.

Washington's slaves

Washington owned and rented enslaved African Americans, and during his lifetime over 577 slaves lived and worked at Mount Vernon. He acquired them through inheritance, gaining control of 84 dower slaves upon his marriage to Martha, and purchased at least 71 slaves between 1752 and 1773. From 1786 he rented slaves, at his death he was renting 41. His early views on slavery were no different from any Virginia planter of the time. From the 1760s his attitudes underwent a slow evolution. The first doubts were prompted by his transition from tobacco to grain crops, which left him with a costly surplus of slaves, causing him to question the system's economic efficiency. His growing disillusionment with the institution was spurred by the principles of the American Revolution and revolutionary friends such as Lafayette and Hamilton. Most historians agree the Revolution was central to the evolution of Washington's attitudes on slavery; "After 1783", Kenneth Morgan writes, "...[Washington] began to express inner tensions about the problem of slavery more frequently, though always in private..."

The many contemporary reports of slave treatment at Mount Vernon are varied and conflicting. Historian Kenneth Morgan (2000) maintains that Washington was frugal on spending for clothes and bedding for his slaves, and only provided them with just enough food, and that he maintained strict control over his slaves, instructing his overseers to keep them working hard from dawn to dusk year-round. However, historian Dorothy Twohig (2001) said: "Food, clothing, and housing seem to have been at least adequate". Washington faced growing debts involved with the costs of supporting slaves. He held an "engrained sense of racial superiority" towards African Americans but harbored no ill feelings toward them. Some enslaved families worked at different locations on the plantation but were allowed to visit one another on their days off. Washington's slaves received two hours off for meals during the workday and were given time off on Sundays and religious holidays.

Some accounts report that Washington opposed flogging but at times sanctioned its use, generally as a last resort, on both men and women slaves. Washington used both reward and punishment to encourage discipline and productivity in his slaves. He tried appealing to an individual's sense of pride, gave better blankets and clothing to the "most deserving", and motivated his slaves with cash rewards. He believed "watchfulness and admonition" to be often better deterrents against transgressions but would punish those who "will not do their duty by fair means". Punishment ranged in severity from demotion back to fieldwork, through whipping and beatings, to permanent separation from friends and family by sale. Historian Ron Chernow maintains that overseers were required to warn slaves before resorting to the lash and required Washington's written permission before whipping, though his extended absences did not always permit this. Washington remained dependent on slave labor to work his farms and negotiated the purchase of more slaves in 1786 and 1787.

Washington brought several of his slaves with him and his family to the federal capital during his presidency. When the capital moved from New York City to Philadelphia in 1791, the president began rotating his slave household staff periodically between the capital and Mount Vernon. This was done deliberately to circumvent Pennsylvania's Slavery Abolition Act, which, in part, automatically freed any slave who moved to the state and lived there for more than six months. In May 1796, Martha's personal and favorite slave Oney Judge escaped to Portsmouth. At Martha's behest, Washington attempted to capture Ona, using a Treasury agent, but this effort failed. In February 1797, Washington's personal slave Hercules escaped to Philadelphia and was never found.

In February 1786, Washington took a census of Mount Vernon and recorded 224 slaves. By 1799, slaves at Mount Vernon totaled 317, including 143 children. Washington owned 124 slaves, leased 40, and held 153 for his wife's dower interest. Washington supported many slaves who were too young or too old to work, greatly increasing Mount Vernon's slave population and causing the plantation to operate at a loss.

Abolition and manumission 

Based on his letters, diary, documents, accounts from colleagues, employees, friends, and visitors, Washington slowly developed a cautious sympathy toward abolitionism that eventually ended with his will freeing his military/war valet Billy Lee, and then subsequently freeing the rest of his personally-owned slaves outright upon Martha's death. As president, he remained publicly silent on the topic of slavery, believing it was a nationally divisive issue that could destroy the union.

During the American Revolutionary War, Washington began to change his views on slavery. In a 1778 letter to Lund Washington, he made clear his desire "to get quit of Negroes" when discussing the exchange of slaves for the land he wanted to buy. The next year, Washington stated his intention not to separate enslaved families as a result of "a change of masters". During the 1780s, Washington privately expressed his support for the gradual emancipation of slaves. Between 1783 and 1786, he gave moral support to a plan proposed by Lafayette to purchase land and free slaves to work on it, but declined to participate in the experiment. Washington privately expressed support for emancipation to prominent Methodists Thomas Coke and Francis Asbury in 1785 but declined to sign their petition. In personal correspondence the next year, he made clear his desire to see the institution of slavery ended by a gradual legislative process, a view that correlated with the mainstream antislavery literature published in the 1780s that Washington possessed. He significantly reduced his purchases of slaves after the war but continued to acquire them in small numbers.

In 1788, Washington declined a suggestion from a leading French abolitionist, Jacques Brissot, to establish an abolitionist society in Virginia, stating that although he supported the idea, the time was not yet right to confront the issue. The historian Henry Wiencek (2003) believes, based on a remark that appears in the notebook of his biographer David Humphreys, that Washington considered making a public statement by freeing his slaves on the eve of his presidency in 1789. The historian Philip D. Morgan (2005) disagrees, believing the remark was a "private expression of remorse" at his inability to free his slaves. Other historians agree with Morgan that Washington was determined not to risk national unity over an issue as divisive as slavery. Washington never responded to any of the antislavery petitions he received, and the subject was not mentioned in either his last address to Congress or his Farewell Address.

The first clear indication that Washington seriously intended to free his slaves appears in a letter written to his secretary, Tobias Lear, in 1794. Washington instructed Lear to find buyers for his land in western Virginia, explaining in a private coda that he was doing so "to liberate a certain species of property which I possess, very repugnantly to my own feelings". The plan, along with others Washington considered in 1795 and 1796, could not be realized because he failed to find buyers for his land, his reluctance to break up slave families, and the refusal of the Custis heirs to help prevent such separations by freeing their dower slaves at the same time.

On July 9, 1799, Washington finished making his last will; the longest provision concerned slavery. All his slaves were to be freed after the death of his wife, Martha. Washington said he did not free them immediately because his slaves intermarried with his wife's dower slaves. He forbade their sale or transportation out of Virginia. His will provided that old and young freed people be taken care of indefinitely; younger ones were to be taught to read and write and placed in suitable occupations. Washington freed more than 160 slaves, including about 25 he had acquired from his wife's brother Bartholomew Dandridge in payment of a debt. He was among the few large slave-holding Virginians during the Revolutionary Era who emancipated their slaves.

On January 1, 1801, one year after George Washington's death, Martha Washington signed an order to free his slaves. Many of them, having never strayed far from Mount Vernon, were naturally reluctant to try their luck elsewhere; others refused to abandon spouses or children still held as dower slaves (the Custis estate) and also stayed with or near Martha. Following George Washington's instructions in his will, funds were used to feed and clothe the young, aged, and infirm slaves until the early 1830s.

Historical reputation and legacy 

Washington's legacy endures as one of the most influential in American history since he served as commander-in-chief of the Continental Army, a hero of the Revolution, and the first president of the United States. Various historians maintain that he also was a dominant factor in America's founding, the Revolutionary War, and the Constitutional Convention. Revolutionary War comrade Light-Horse Harry Lee eulogized him as "First in war—first in peace—and first in the hearts of his countrymen". Lee's words became the hallmark by which Washington's reputation was impressed upon the American memory, with some biographers regarding him as the great exemplar of republicanism. He set many precedents for the national government and the presidency in particular, and he was called the "Father of His Country" as early as 1778.

In 1879, Congress proclaimed Washington's Birthday to be a federal holiday. Twentieth-century biographer Douglas Southall Freeman concluded, "The great big thing stamped across that man is character." Modern historian David Hackett Fischer has expanded upon Freeman's assessment, defining Washington's character as "integrity, self-discipline, courage, absolute honesty, resolve, and decision, but also forbearance, decency, and respect for others".

Washington became an international symbol for liberation and nationalism as the leader of the first successful revolution against a colonial empire. The Federalists made him the symbol of their party, but the Jeffersonians continued to distrust his influence for many years and delayed building the Washington Monument. Washington was elected a member of the American Academy of Arts and Sciences on January 31, 1781, before he had even begun his presidency. He was posthumously appointed to the grade of General of the Armies of the United States during the United States Bicentennial to ensure he would never be outranked; this was accomplished by the congressional joint resolution Public Law 94-479 passed on January 19, 1976, with an effective appointment date of July 4, 1976. On March 13, 1978, Washington was militarily promoted to the rank of General of the Armies.

Parson Weems wrote a hagiographic biography in 1809 to honor Washington. Historian Ron Chernow maintains that Weems attempted to humanize Washington, making him look less stern, and to inspire "patriotism and morality" and to foster "enduring myths", such as Washington's refusal to lie about damaging his father's cherry tree. Weems' accounts have never been proven or disproven. Historian John Ferling, however, maintains that Washington remains the only founder and president ever to be referred to as "godlike", and points out that his character has been the most scrutinized by historians, past and present. Historian Gordon S. Wood concludes that "the greatest act of his life, the one that gave him his greatest fame, was his resignation as commander-in-chief of the American forces." Chernow suggests that Washington was "burdened by public life" and divided by "unacknowledged ambition mingled with self-doubt". A 1993 review of presidential polls and surveys consistently ranked Washington number 4, 3, or2 among presidents. A 2018 Siena College Research Institute survey ranked him number1 among presidents.

In the 21st century, Washington's reputation has been critically scrutinized. Along with various other Founding Fathers, he has been condemned for holding enslaved human beings. Though he expressed the desire to see the abolition of slavery come through legislation, he did not initiate or support any initiatives for bringing about its end. This has led to calls from some activists to remove his name from public buildings and his statue from public spaces. Nonetheless, Washington maintains his place among the highest-ranked U.S. Presidents, listed second (after Lincoln) in a 2021 C-SPAN poll.

Memorials

Jared Sparks began collecting and publishing Washington's documentary record in the 1830s in Life and Writings of George Washington (12 vols., 1834–1837). The Writings of George Washington from the Original Manuscript Sources, 1745–1799 (1931–1944) is a 39-volume set edited by John Clement Fitzpatrick, whom the George Washington Bicentennial Commission commissioned. It contains more than 17,000 letters and documents and is available online from the University of Virginia.

Educational institutions 

Numerous secondary schools are named in honor of Washington, as are many universities, including George Washington University and Washington University in St. Louis.

Places and monuments 

Many places and monuments have been named in honor of Washington, most notably the capital of the United States, Washington, D.C. The state of Washington is the only US state to be named after a president.

Washington appears as one of four U.S. presidents in a colossal statue by Gutzon Borglum on Mount Rushmore in South Dakota.

Currency and postage 

George Washington appears on contemporary U.S. currency, including the one-dollar bill, the Presidential one-dollar coin and the quarter-dollar coin (the Washington quarter). Washington and Benjamin Franklin appeared on the nation's first postage stamps in 1847. Washington has since appeared on many postage issues, more than any other person.

See also 

 British Army during the American Revolutionary War
 Founders Online
 List of American Revolutionary War battles
 List of Continental Forces in the American Revolutionary War
 Timeline of the American Revolution

References

Notes

Citations

Bibliography

Print sources

Primary sources

Online sources

External links

 Scholarly coverage of Washington at Miller Center, U of Virginia
 George Washington Resources at the University of Virginia Library
 George Washington's Speeches: Quote-search-tool
 Original Digitized Letters of George Washington  Shapell Manuscript Foundation
 The Papers of George Washington, subset of Founders Online from the National Archives
 
 Washington & the American Revolution, BBC Radio4 discussion with Carol Berkin, Simon Middleton & Colin Bonwick (In Our Time, June 24, 2004)
 
 Guide to the George Washington Collection 1776–1792 at the University of Chicago Special Collections Research Center

George Washington
Founding Fathers of the United States
1732 births
1799 deaths
George
People from Mount Vernon, Virginia
People from Westmoreland County, Virginia
Presidents of the United States
18th-century American Episcopalians
18th-century American politicians
18th-century American writers
18th-century presidents of the United States
18th-century United States Army personnel
American cartographers
American foreign policy writers
American Freemasons
American male non-fiction writers
American military personnel of the Seven Years' War
American militia officers
American people of English descent
American planters
American rebels
American slave owners
American surveyors
British America army officers
Burials at Mount Vernon
Candidates in the 1788–1789 United States presidential election
Candidates in the 1792 United States presidential election
Chancellors of the College of William & Mary
Commanders in chief
Commanding Generals of the United States Army
Congressional Gold Medal recipients
Continental Army generals
Continental Army officers from Virginia
Continental Congressmen from Virginia
Respiratory disease deaths in Virginia
Episcopalians from Virginia
Farmers from Virginia
Fellows of the American Academy of Arts and Sciences
Free speech activists
Hall of Fame for Great Americans inductees
House of Burgesses members
Members of the American Philosophical Society
People of the American Enlightenment
People of the Quasi-War
People of Virginia in the French and Indian War
Signers of the Continental Association
Signers of the United States Constitution
United States Army generals
Virginia Independents
Virginia militiamen in the American Revolution
Washington and Lee University people
Washington College people
Virginia dynasty